The Black Fork is a principal tributary of the Cheat River in the Allegheny Mountains of eastern West Virginia, USA.  It is a short stream, about four miles (6 km) in length, formed by the confluence of two other streams not far above its mouth. It was traditionally considered one of the five Forks of Cheat.

Geography
Via the Cheat, Monongahela and Ohio Rivers, it is part of the watershed of the Mississippi River, draining an area of 500 square miles (1,295 km²). The Black Fork flows for its entire length in Tucker County.  It is formed at the town of Hendricks by the confluence of the Dry Fork and the Blackwater River, and flows generally northwestwardly through Hambleton to Parsons, where it joins the Shavers Fork to form the Cheat River.

Name
The U.S. Board on Geographic Names settled on "Black Fork" as the stream's name in 1930.  According to the Geographic Names Information System, it has also been known historically as "Blackwater Fork" and as the Blackwater River.

See also
List of West Virginia rivers
Blackwater Canyon

References
Julian, Norman.  2006.  "Cheat River."  The West Virginia Encyclopedia.  Ken Sullivan, editor.  Charleston, WV: West Virginia Humanities Council.  .

Rivers of West Virginia
Rivers of Tucker County, West Virginia
Monongahela National Forest